Swiss Hotel Management School (SHMS) is a private hospitality management school in Montreux and Leysin, Switzerland. It trains students in the hotel and hospitality industries. The school offers a Bachelor of Hospitality Management program, master's programs, a postgraduate diploma program, and an online Executive Master of Hospitality Management. SHMS was ranked in the top 3 institutions for hospitality management in the 2022 QS World University Rankings.

SHMS is owned by the Swiss Education Group (SEG), an investment of Invision Private Equity AG. Invision invested in SEG in 2008.

History 
SHMS is based in Caux Palace, a historic building with a history of hospitality. Built on the Caux Mount by Swiss architect Eugène Jost, it was inaugurated on 7 July 1902.

Celebrities such as Prince Ibn Saud, Rudyard Kipling, John Paul Meagher, and the Maharajah of Baroda, visited and stayed there until the Second World War. Afterwards, Caux-Palace played an instrumental role in worldwide peacebuilding and reconciliation efforts. SHMS has a second campus in Leysin at the Mont-Blanc Palace. The Leysin campus was formerly the Club Med Hotel in Leysin.

Education 

SHMS has academic programs which combine practical elements from all aspects of the hospitality industry with management skills. It prepares students for senior international positions in the field through its different programs (Bachelor's, Master's, and Postgraduate Diploma).

Undergraduate programs

Three years: Swiss BA (Hons) Degree from Swiss Hotel Management School and British BA (Hons) Degree from the University of Derby in 
 Hospitality Management
 Hospitality and Event Management 
 Design Management

The first two years of the Bachelor program share the same modules, with the third year varying depending on the chosen pathway. All students following the undergraduate program complete the first two years of their studies on the Caux campus and move to the Leysin campus for their third year. Students on all pathways have the opportunity to share certain classes, work on group projects, and organize VIP banquets together. The three-year curriculum is awarded with a Bachelor’s degree accredited by the University of Derby, UK.

Postgraduate programs
The Postgraduate Diploma program has been designed in such a way that, upon successful completion, students may progress directly to the SHMS Master’s Programs.

Master's programs
MSc - Masters of Science in International Hospitality Management (in Partnership with University of Derby)

MA - Master of Arts in International Hotel Business Management

All Master’s programs are one year in length and provide students with the managerial and leadership skills required by the hospitality industry.

Timeline 
1992 The Swiss Hotel Management School (SHMS) was founded as a private hotel management school in Les Paccots.

1995 Move into the Caux Palace located in Montreux.

1998 Partnership established with the University of Derby (UK) for the awards of the Bachelor of Arts (Hons) degree and Master of Arts.

2001 The Swiss Hotel School Association (ASEH) recognized the programs offered at the Swiss Hotel Management School and granted full accreditation.

2004 Acquisition of the Mont-Blanc Palace and Belvédère hotels in Leysin and opening of the Leysin campus.

2006 Revalidation of the programs run in partnership with the University of Derby. The programs are the Bachelor of Arts (Hons) and Master of Arts.

2011 Launch of the Master of International Business in Resort and Spa Management programs. Opening of a student-managed spa with a public section in Leysin.

2012 Swiss eduQua qualification awarded; The ʻBuffet de la Gare’ in Caux, a student-run restaurant, opens to the public.

2013 Launch of the Master of Science in International Hospitality Management, building on the success of the Master of Arts in International Hospitality Management.

2017 SHMS earns recognition as an Apple Distinguished School for the first time.

See also
Hotel Institute Montreux 
Cesar Ritz Colleges 
International Hotel and Tourism Training Institute
Swiss Education Group

References 

Hospitality schools in Switzerland
Business schools in Switzerland
Leysin
Montreux